The Daito wren (Troglodytes troglodytes orii) is a controversial subspecies of the Eurasian wren. It is known only by the type specimen, a male collected in 1938 on Minami Daitō-jima, the main island of the Daito Archipelago east of Okinawa. Yamashina described the bird as a new subspecies after comparing it with 114 specimens from surrounding areas and under the impression that the Eurasian wren is a fairly sedentary bird, not liable to be drifted astray over long distances. Its scientific name honors Yamashina's specimen collector, Hyojiri Orii.

However, stray Eurasian wrens have more recently been found on Yonaguni and Okinawa Islands. Thus, it has been hypothesized that the Daito bird was just a straggler from the Honshū (T. t. fumigatus), the Yakushima/Tanegashima (T. t. ogawae) or the Izu Islands (T. t. mosukei) population (Vaurie, 1955). As the specimen exists (Yamashina Institute for Ornithology collection No. 25476), it should be possible to resolve its status by DNA analysis. Certainly, many bird populations on islands south of Japan became extinct in the late 1930s as settlement and civilian and military construction destroyed large amounts of habitat.

References
 Vaurie, Charles (1955): Systematic notes on Palearctic birds. No. 16, Troglodytinae, Cinclidae, and Prunellidae. American Museum Novitates 1751: 1-25. PDF fulltext
 Yamashina, Yoshimaro (1938): A New Subspecies of Troglodytes troglodytes from the Borodino Islands. Tori 10: 227–228.

Troglodytes (bird)
Controversial bird taxa
Birds described in 1938
Bird extinctions since 1500
Extinct birds of Oceania

ja:ダイトウミソサザイ